Jason Bean is an American politician and farmer serving as a member of the Missouri Senate from the 25th district. Elected in 2020, he assumed office on January 5, 2021.

Early life and education 
Bean was raised in Missouri Bootheel region. He is a fifth-generation farmer and Missouri native. He earned a Bachelor of Science degree in agronomy and animal science from the University of Missouri.

Missouri State Senate 
Bean operated a family farm. He was elected to the Missouri Senate in November 2020, placing first in the Republican primary and running unopposed in the general election. He assumed office on January 5, 2021. He is a self-described constitutional conservative who has frequently discussed "draining the swamp."

In 2021, he serves as the Vice Chairman of the Agriculture, Food Production and Outdoors Resources Committee, and Vice Chairman on the Transportation, Infrastructure and Public Safety

Committee assignments 

 Agriculture, Food Production and Outdoor Resources, Vice-Chairman
 Commerce, Consumer Protection, Energy and the Environment
 Gubernatorial Appointments
 Local Government and Elections
 Transportation, Infrastructure and Public Safety, Vice-Chairman
 Joint Committee on Disaster Preparedness and Awareness
 Joint Committee on Transportation Oversight
 Missouri Commission on the Delta Regional Authority
 Missouri Southern States Energy Board
 Seismic Safety Commission

References 

Living people
Republican Party Missouri state senators
University of Missouri alumni
Year of birth missing (living people)